The Birmingham Union Workhouse was a workhouse on Western Road in Birmingham, England.

Earlier workhouse 
The Birmingham Workhouse Infirmary was a workhouse constructed in 1734 on the site of the present day Coleridge Passage, now opposite Birmingham Children's Hospital. This facility had hosted the medical lectures of Mr John Tomlinson, the First Surgeon of the infirmary; these lectures, commencing in 1767 were the precursor to the foundation of the Birmingham Medical School in 1825 and were among the first formal medical lectures held outside London and Scotland.

History
A new infirmary building, built to increase the capacity of the old one, was constructed between 1850 and 1852 under the Poor Law Amendment Act of 1834, to designs by John Jones Bateman and G Drury. The main entrance building, though derelict, survived until demolition in September 2017. Its arched entrance was known as "the arch of tears". The remainder of the workhouse was demolished in the early 1990s.

In 1889 a hospital was built as an extension to the workhouse. This still exists, much developed, as City Hospital.

Despite its age and social significance, calls by the Victorian Society and Birmingham Conservation Trust, for the workhouse entrance building to be listed, were turned down by English Heritage in 2010.

References

Further reading
 Hetherington, RJ (1991) Birmingham Workhouse Records by (in Midland Ancestor, 9).

Workhouses in Birmingham, West Midlands
Demolished buildings and structures in the West Midlands (county)
Buildings and structures completed in 1852
1852 establishments in England
Poor law infirmaries
Buildings and structures demolished in 2017